Perumpallam Dam is a dam in Sathyamangalam, Erode district, Tamil Nadu, southeastern India. It is fed by rainwater from the Kadambur Hills and the Bhavani River. It was built in the 1980s. It measures roughly 2 km long and 40 metres in height and occupies 65.29 hectares of land. The reservoir which the dam inundates is subject to dramatic changes in water levels, from drought to heavy flooding such as in November 2006.

References

Dams in Tamil Nadu
Buildings and structures in Erode district
1980s establishments in Tamil Nadu
Dams completed in the 1980s
Year of establishment missing
20th-century architecture in India